Methylclostebol, also known as 4-chloro-17α-methyltestosterone or as 4-chloro-17α-methylandrost-4-en-17β-ol-3-one, is a synthetic, orally active anabolic-androgenic steroid (AAS) and designer steroid that has been sold on the Internet as a "dietary supplement", but it has never been studied for medical use.  It is the 17α-alkylated variant of clostebol (4-chlorotestosterone).

Rahnema, Crosnoe, and Kim (2015) reported that German athletes  used methylclostebol as a performance enhancing drug in the 1960s and 1970s, but this has not been substantiated. The compound is listed as a banned anabolic agent by the World Anti-Doping Agency.

See also
 Chlorodehydromethylandrostenediol
 Chlorodehydromethyltestosterone
 Chloromethylandrostenediol
 Oxymesterone

References

Androgens and anabolic steroids
Androstanes
Designer drugs
Organochlorides
World Anti-Doping Agency prohibited substances